Sunday Sunny Mill Valley Groove Day is an album by Frank Black and the Catholics, recorded in 2000. Because Black was not completely happy with the recording sessions, he decided against a commercial release. However, he did hand out several copies of the album at shows, which fans uploaded to the internet. Several tracks were later used as B-sides or rerecorded for the albums Devil's Workshop (2002), Black Letter Days (2002) and Honeycomb (2005).

In 2015, many (though not all) of the tracks were included on the Frank Black and the Catholics: The Complete Recordings box set.

Background
Frank Black told Magnet magazine in 2002: "We made a record that ended up on the Internet called Sunday Mill Valley Groove Day, and it was just an OK session but in general it was not an album, so we didn’t release it as an album. I had a few copies of it in my pocket and I was on tour and a couple of super-excited kids who seemed like they deserved something special happened to be there and I said, "Here you go," and they posted it, like, the next day. I didn’t ask my audience to buy it. It’s a freebie, I’m not going to sell it."

Track listing

Personnel
Credits adapted from frankblack.net.
Frank Black and the Catholics
Frank Black – vocals, guitar
Rich Gilbert – guitar, pedal steel guitar, vocals
Eric Drew Feldman – piano, organ, electric piano, keyboards
David McCaffery – bass, vocals
Scott Boutier – drums
Technical
Eric Drew Feldman – producer
Kevin Ink – recording engineer

References

2000 albums
Black Francis albums
Unreleased albums